Philip Sinon is a Seychellois Olympic middle-distance runner. He represented his country in the men's 1500 meters and the men's 800 meters at the 1984 Summer Olympics. His time was a 4:25.80 in the 1500, and a 2:04.89 in the 800 heats.

References 

1963 births
Living people
Seychellois male middle-distance runners
Olympic athletes of Seychelles
Athletes (track and field) at the 1984 Summer Olympics
Commonwealth Games competitors for Seychelles
Athletes (track and field) at the 1990 Commonwealth Games